Augustus Young (March 20, 1784June 17, 1857) was an American politician. He served as a United States representative from Vermont, a member of the Vermont House of Representatives, state’s attorney for Orleans County, a judge of probate, a county assistant judge, and a member of the Vermont State Senate.

Early life
Young was born in Arlington in the Vermont Republic on March 20, 1784. He completed preparatory studies, studied law with Isaac Warner of Cambridge and Bates Turner of St. Albans, and was admitted to the bar in 1810. He began the practice of law in Stowe.

Career
Young moved to Craftsbury in 1812. He was a member of the Vermont House of Representatives from 1821 until 1824, 1826, 1828 until 1830 and 1832.  He was state’s attorney for Orleans County, Vermont, from 1824 to 1828; judge of probate in 1830 and 1831; and served in the Vermont State Senate from 1836 to 1838.

Young was elected as a Whig candidate to the 27th United States Congress, serving from March 4, 1841, to March 3, 1843. He declined to be a candidate for renomination, resumed the practice of law, and engaged in literary pursuits.

Young moved to St. Albans, and became assistant judge of the Franklin County Court from 1851 to 1854. In 1856, he was appointed State Naturalist due to his knowledge as a geologist and a mineralogist. He wrote "On the Quadrature of the Circle" and "Unity of Purpose".

Death
Young died in St. Albans on June 17, 1857. He is interred at Greenwood Cemetery, Saint Albans, Franklin County, Vermont.

Published works
 "Preliminary Report on the Natural History of the State of Vermont" by Augustus Young Vermont State Geologist, published by Carruthers Press, July 2008.

References

External links

Govtrack US Congress
 Fragmentary records of the Youngs
The Political Graveyard

1784 births
1857 deaths
Whig Party members of the United States House of Representatives from Vermont
19th-century American politicians
State's attorneys in Vermont
People from Craftsbury, Vermont